is a 2006 Japanese animated feature film and the 10th entry in the Case Closed film series released on April 15, 2006. It earned 3.03 billion yen in the box office.

Summary

 It is the Detective Conan series' 10th anniversary commemorative work.
 The third appearance of Kaito Kid within the film series.
 The focus of the film is to save the hostages Mouri Ran, Suzuki Sonoko, and Toyama Kazuha.
 The advertisement and the poster's conclusion: "Detectives, I hope you will sleep forever."
 This film is the second theatrical version so far in which, if the case cannot be solved, all participants will die (the first is The Phantom of Baker Street).
 Kudo Shinichi, Hattori Heiji, Hakuba Saguru (actually Kid disguised), and Kaito Kid (Kaito Kuroba) all appear in this film.
 The total box office revenue of this film in Taipei was once the highest among all theater versions for eight years, and it was not broken until 2014 by Detective Conan: Dimensional Sniper.
 This film is the only theater version so far that Tsuburaya Mitsuhiko is not voiced by Otani Yue.

Plot
Conan, Kogoro, Ran, Ayumi, Genta, Mitsuhiko and Haibara are invited to visit a client in a hotel beside a theme park called Miracle Land. Ran and the kids leave after being given free theme park wristbands, while Conan and Kogoro are forced by the client to solve a mystery to remove the wrist watches, which are set to detonate. The client also reveals that the wristbands given to Ran and company are set to detonate should they leave the premises. The mystery man reveals that two other detectives gave up, one killed, while one is still working.

Conan and Kogoro investigate an empty hotel where they find ski masks and a gun, which were used for a robbery. On the same date of the robbery, Kaitou Kid stole some jewels from a nearby company. Kogoro retrieves the bag, but ends up getting arrested as Kid's accomplice. The mysterious man calls Conan, correctly identifies him as Shinichi and gives him a second clue.

Conan meets Heiji Hattori who reveals that he is also part of the search, with his friend Kazuha also held captive. Hattori and Conan work together and end up in Yokohama Ocean University where they join together with Hakuba Saguru, a famous detective from the North. They find out that one of the former presidents of the club, Nishio, was charged with the murder of a classmate. Hattori then confirms with the client through the phone that the mystery he wants them to solve was the murder case.

They are attacked by two motorcyclists working for a person who is trying to kill Kaitou Kid. To escape, the three detectives split up. Conan ends up falling from a bridge and breaks his leg.

Kogoro is already giving his report to the client in the hotel when Hattori knocks him out so he does not get killed for giving a wrong conclusion. They then discover the client who is a blind wheelchair user and reveal the truth to him. The client, Nishio and Reiko, a woman who the client was in love with, were staging the robbery of an armored car. The robbery went wrong when a guard was killed and the robbers' escape was then witnessed by Kaitou Kid. Thus, the Nishio was murdered in order to keep the involvement of the other two silent. Conan and Hattori reveal that Nishio was already dead before the client shot him and that Reiko was the true killer. When the client panicked and tried to leave the city, his car was sabotaged in an attempt to kill him.

Reiko appears at that moment and confirms the truth behind the incident. She attempts to kill the detectives but is knocked out.

Conan accesses the computer to change the settings on the wristbands but fails due to the computer receiving damage from a loose gunshot. Conan manages to deactivate the link but not the restricted area however. The watches are then collected by the police except one (Genta) which is not accounted for as the police thought that the number of wristband is correct. They forgot to include the fact that Sonoko Suzuki is not involved in the case therefore they should include one more in the number of wristband collected. After the police collected the wristbands, all of them went to the snake ride. Genta brought along the wristband for the snake ride. At the start of the ride, Hattori saw the wristband and shouted. Haibara managed to remove but due to the motion of the ride, the wristband lands on the last seat of the ride. When the ride reaches the sea which is out of the restricted zone, Kaitou Kid took the wristband and let it explode safely.

Conan reveals that Kid was with them for a long time, disguised as Hakuba Saguru. The death of the three previous detectives hired by the client is revealed to have been staged.

Cast
Minami Takayama as Conan Edogawa
Wakana Yamazaki as Ran Mouri
Akira Kamiya as Kogoro Mouri
Kappei Yamaguchi as Shinichi Kudo and Kaito Kid
Ryo Horikawa as Heiji Hattori
Yuko Miyamura as Kazuha Toyama
Kenichi Ogata as Professor Hiroshi Agasa
Megumi Hayashibara as Ai Haibara
Yukiko Iwai as Ayumi Yoshida
Ai Orikasa as Mitsuhiko Tsuburaya
Wataru Takagi  as Genta Kojima and Officer Takagi
Naoko Matsui as Sonoko Suzuki
Chafurin as Inspector Megure
Kazuhiko Inoue as Officer Shiratori
Atsuko Yuya as Officer Satou
Isshin Chiba as Officer Chiba
Takehiro Koyama as Heizo Hattori
Shinji Ogawa as Ginshiro Toyama
Akio Ohtsuka as Inspector Yokomizo
Norio Wakamoto as Officer Ohtaki
Gara Takashima as Eri Kisaki
Asako Dodo as Midori Kuriyama
Unshou Ishizuka as Detective Nakamori
Akira Ishida as Saguru Hakuba
Kazuko Sugiyama as Fortune Teller
Masaya Onosaka as Chestnut criminal
Mitsuo Iwata as Homeless Gaz
Arimasa Ohsawa as Policeman
Akio Nojima as Souichiro Miyama
Aruno Tahara as Masao Takada
Rikiya Koyama as Ryuucha
Fumi Hirano as Reiko Shimizu
Toru Furuya as Mysterious client:Ito Suehiko

Music
The theme song is "Yuruginaimono Hitotsu" (ゆるぎないものひとつ) by B'z. It was released on April 12, 2006. Along with The Last Wizard of the Century and The Phantom of Baker Street, this is the third Case Closed film theme wrote by B'z.

The official soundtrack was released on April 12, 2006.

Home media

DVD
There are two versions of the DVD released, a special version and a regular version, both released on December 13, 2006. The special version contains a disc with the film and trailers, and a bonus disc with all of the film and Detective Conan 10 Years Special Thanks commercials, costing ¥7350. The regular version contains only a disc with the film and trailers, costing ¥6090.

Blu-ray
The Blu-ray version of the film was released on February 25, 2011. The Blu-ray contains the same content of the DVD plus a mini-booklet explaining the film and the BD-live function.

References

External links
 
Official TMS website  
Official TMS website  

2006 anime films
TMS Entertainment
Toho films
Films set in Yokohama
Private Eyes' Requiem
Films directed by Yasuichiro Yamamoto